George Barney Poole (October 29, 1923 – April 12, 2005) was an American football end in the National Football League for the New York Yanks, the Dallas Texans, the Baltimore Colts, and the New York Giants. Poole also played football in the All-America Football Conference for the New York Yankees. Poole played college football at the University of Mississippi, where he was an All-American as an offensive and defensive end. He was inducted into the College Football Hall of Fame in 1974.

Barney Poole was preceded in the NFL by two brothers, Jim "Buster" Poole and Ray Poole, both of whom had long professional football careers. Barney Poole was one of the few players who played college football for more than four years, because his two years with the national championship Army team were not counted against his collegiate eligibility.

NFL Hall of Famer Art Donovan shared this anecdote about Poole, his teammate with the 1953 Colts: "Early in my career—the Colts' first year back in Baltimore, as a matter of fact—I played with a defensive lineman named Barney Poole.  He was a tough guy, but by 1953 he was pretty much over the hill.  And he was doing anything he could to hang on.  In one game he tore up his hand.  He caught his fingers in someone's face mask and it nearly yanked a couple of the digits out.  That hand was a mess.  This happened sometime early in the second quarter, and Barney was led off the field and into the locker room and soon thereafter an ambulance carried him off to Union Memorial.  He got his fingers stitched up.  I swear to God, he got out on Thirty-third Street and hitchhiked right back up to Memorial Stadium.  Damned if he didn't return in time to play the fourth quarter.  And he did play, too, with a big wrapping on those twisted and mangled fingers.  He was one tough player, and the Colts rewarded him the following season by cutting his ass."

See also

 List of NCAA major college football yearly receiving leaders

References

External links
 
 ESPN obituary

1923 births
2005 deaths
People from Gloster, Mississippi
Players of American football from Mississippi
American football ends
American football defensive ends
Ole Miss Rebels football players
North Carolina Tar Heels football players
Army Black Knights football players
College Football Hall of Fame inductees
New York Yankees (AAFC) players
New York Yanks players
Dallas Texans (NFL) players
Baltimore Colts players
New York Giants players
Coaches of American football from Mississippi
Alabama Crimson Tide football coaches